MCI Group, based in Geneva, Switzerland, is the world's largest professional conference organiser employing 1,800 people in 31 countries as of April 2016. The company also operates as an association management company, or AMC.

MCI operates marketing-events firm Black Flower Agency; Don't Believe in Style, a cultural creative agency in southeast Asia; technical production firm Dorier; performance measurement services firm FairControl; public-affairs company Logos Public Affairs; destination management company Ovation DMC; and incentive-travel operator Hagen Invent.

In 2015, the company acquired McLean, Va.-based Coulter Cos., an AMC, which has since been rebranded MCI USA.

Roger Tondeur founded MCI in Geneva in 1987. In 2010, he handed over the reins to his son, Sébastien Tondeur, who now leads the company as CEO.

References

External links
 MCI Group

Business conferences
Organisations based in Switzerland